Verbena hastata, commonly known as American vervain, blue vervain, simpler's joy, or swamp verbena, is a perennial flowering plant in the vervain family Verbenaceae. It grows throughout the continental United States and in much of southern Canada.

Description
The stems are four-angled (square), hairy, and green to reddish in color. They have doubly-serrate margins and a variety of shapes, from lanceolate to ovate, and may have 2 lateral lobes. 

The flowers are violet or deep purple, rarely white. They open from the bottom of the spike upward, with only a ring of a few flowers open at a time.

Taxonomy
This species is a member of the diploid North American vervains which have 14 chromosomes altogether. Hybridization seems to have played some role in its evolution, presumably between some member of a group including the white vervain (V. urticifolia), V. lasiostachys or V. menthifolia, and V. orcuttiana or a related species.

In the recent evolutionary past, there has been an incident of chloroplast transfer of one of the latter or the swamp verbena to the mock vervain Glandularia bipinnatifida which is a close relative of the genus Verbena. It is unknown by what mechanism this happened, but it is suspected that hybridization is not responsible.

Etymology
The Latin specific epithet hastata means "spear-shaped".

Distribution and habitat
V. hastata is native in the United States in all states except Alaska and Hawaii. In Canada, it is native in the provinces of British Columbia, Saskatchewan, Manitoba, Ottawa, Quebec, New Brunswick, Nova Scotia, and Prince Edward Island. The plant prefers moist conditions and typically grows in wet meadows, wet river bottomlands, stream banks, slough peripheries, fields and waste areas. It is adapted to wetlands and can spread to form small colonies.

Ecology
The flowers bloom from mid- to late summer.

It attracts bees and is a larval host to the common buckeye butterfly (Junonia coenia), the verbena moth (Crambodes talidiformis), and the verbena bud moth (Endothenia hebesana).

Footnotes

References

Yuan, Yao-Wu & Olmstead, Richard G. (2008): A species-level phylogenetic study of the Verbena complex (Verbenaceae) indicates two independent intergeneric chloroplast transfers. Molecular Phylogenetics and Evolution 48(1): 23–33.

External links
 
 
 
 Jepson Manual Treatment
 Washington Burke Museum

hastata
Flora of Western Canada
Plants described in 1753
Taxa named by Carl Linnaeus
Flora of Eastern Canada
Flora of the Northeastern United States
Flora of the Southeastern United States
Flora of the North-Central United States
Flora of the South-Central United States
Flora of the Northwestern United States
Flora of the Southwestern United States